The ROH Pure Tournament was a single-elimination professional wrestling tournament produced by Ring of Honor Wrestling. The tournament, originally scheduled to start on April 12, commenced on September 12, 2020 and ended on October 31, 2020. It featured 16 wrestlers competing for the newly-reactivated ROH Pure Championship: 9 from Ring of Honor, 2 from New Japan Pro-Wrestling, and 5 free agent or independent wrestlers.

Background

History 
The ROH Pure Championship was announced to be reactivated on April 12, 2020, being used for the first time since 2006, with events to take place in Columbus, Ohio and Pittsburgh, Pennsylvania. However, plans had to be put on hold due to the COVID-19 pandemic, with ROH suspending all television production immediately thereafter. In August, it was announced that ROH would return to producing TV starting in September with the ROH Pure Tournament that was originally scheduled 5 months ago. The field of announced wrestlers includes Jay Lethal, Dalton Castle, Jonathan Gresham, Tracy Williams, Kenny King, P. J. Black, Josh Woods, Delirious, and Silas Young from Ring of Honor, David Finlay and Rocky Romero from New Japan Pro-Wrestling, and Matt Sydal, Fred Yehi, Tony Deppen, Wheeler Yuta, and Rust Taylor from the independent circuit. In the event that any wrestler is unable to compete for any reason, there are 2 alternate wrestlers for each block: Dak Draper for block A and Brian Johnson for block B.

Rules 
16 wrestlers compete in a single-elimination tournament, split off into two blocks of "A" (represented by the color red) and "B" (represented by the color silver). The rounds have increasing time limits, starting at a 15-minute time limit for round 1, 20 for round 2, 30 for the block finals, and a 1 hour time limit for the tournament final. Every match begins and ends with the traditional Code of Honor handshake. Each wrestler is allowed only 3 rope breaks for breaking up submissions and pinfalls. After all rope breaks are exhausted, pins and submissions outside of the boundary of the ropes are considered legal. Closed fist punches to the face are illegal, with the first use garnering a warning from the referee and the second use resulting in a disqualification. Open-hand slaps and chops to the face, as well as all punches to the body, excluding low blows, are permitted. Should a match go to a time limit draw, the decision will go to 3 judges positioned at ringside. Any wrestler that interferes in any match will be fired from the company. Once a new champion is crowned, the title can change hands by count-out or disqualification.

Storylines 
The tournament included matches that result from scripted storylines, where wrestlers portray heroes, villains, or less distinguishable characters in scripted events that build tension and culminate in a wrestling match or series of matches.

Results

Bracket

Scorecards

Josh Woods vs. Kenny King

Notes

References

External links 

Ring of Honor tournaments